The following is a list of ambassadors to the Republic of the Philippines.

Resident Ambassadors

Non-Resident Ambassadors

References

 
Philippines